Welsh Australians are citizens of Australia whose ancestry originates in Wales.

Number of Welsh Australians

According to the 2006 Australian census 25,317 Australian residents were born in Wales,  while 113,242 (0.44%) claimed Welsh ancestry, either alone or with another ancestry. 
 
The name Jones, which is common Wales although the name first arrived from England in the middle ages, is one of most-common surnames in Australia, accounting for over 1% of Australians, which suggests a higher rate of Welsh ancestry than indicated by self-identification.

A 1996 study gives the total ethnic strength of Welsh Australians as 243,400. This is made up by 44,100 of un-mixed origin and 683,700 of mixed origin. This would make the Welsh the fifth largest Anglo-Celtic group in Australia after the English, Irish, Scottish and Cornish.

Welsh emigration to Australia
It is believed that the eastern coast of Australia reminded Captain James Cook of the coast of South Wales (especially the Vale of Glamorgan coast, which he knew), hence the name he gave to it, "New South Wales". The first European colony in Australia was in New South Wales, beginning with the First Fleet of 1788. Welsh people numbered amongst these first settlers, and continued to arrive in the new colony through the British policy of penal transportation that was implemented for many criminal acts.

Mass emigration from Wales to Australia began in the nineteenth century with New South Wales and Victoria being popular destinations. Nineteenth-century Welsh settlers were mostly farmers, followed later by gold diggers and coal miners.

A gold rush began in Australia in the early 1850s, and the Eureka Stockade rebellion in 1854 was an early expression of nationalist sentiment. Amongst its leaders was the Welsh-born Chartist John Basson Humffray, one of a significant group of immigrants that came over from Wales at this time.

List of notable Welsh Australians

See also

 Welsh Americans

References

Further reading
 Lloyd, Lewis. (1988) Australians from Wales Caernarfon: Gwynedd Archives. 

 
European Australian